The Church of St Mary of the Purification is a parish church in the Church of England in Blidworth, Nottinghamshire, dating from the 15th century. It is a Grade II* listed building.

Building
Only the west tower from the medieval (15th century) church survives. The rest was built in 1739 by Rhodes of Barlborough and 1839 by Colvin. It is of ashlar with a lead roof.  The graveyard includes a 1963 model of the earlier church.   The clock tower has two clocks, one facing West, the other East which would be visible to people approaching from either direction along Main Street.

Notable burials
The church is reputed to be the burial place of Will Scarlet. The place is not known, but a piece of the earlier church serves as a memorial.

Rocking Ceremony
The Church of St Mary of the Purification is the only church that is known to continue to hold an annual Rocking Ceremony during which a baby boy, born nearest to Christmas Day and having married, Christian parents living in Blidworth, is “rocked” in a cradle on the Feast of the Purification of Mary, which is on the Sunday nearest to Candlemas.

The ceremony is a symbolic enactment of the story from the Bible found in Luke's gospel, depicting the Presentation of Christ at a temple. It is thought to have started in the 13th century, but was banned from 1600. The custom was revived in 1842 by the vicar, John Lowndes but then fell out of use. It was revived again in 1922, and has been using the same cradle since then.

All of the babies who have taken part in the Rocking Ceremonies have their names recorded upon a plaque at the rear of St Mary's Church with their full name and the year in which they were 'Rocked'. In 2010 a sculpture of a cradle was made to celebrate the custom.

See also
Grade II* listed buildings in Nottinghamshire
Listed buildings in Blidworth

Sources

Grade II* listed churches in Nottinghamshire
Church of England church buildings in Nottinghamshire
Mary